The 1975 Baylor Bears football team represented the Baylor University in the 1975 NCAA Division I football season.  The Bears finished the season fifth in the Southwest Conference.

Schedule

References

Baylor
Baylor Bears football seasons
Baylor Bears football